In Hebrew, the feminine noun aveira or averah (  pl. aveirot ) is a transgression or sin against man or God. The word comes from the Hebrew root ayin-bet-resh, meaning to pass or cross over with the implied meaning of transgressing from a moral boundary.  An aveira may be trivial or serious.

It is viewed by many that an aveira is the opposite of a mitzvah (commandment, often viewed as a good deed), but all aveirot are actually the transgressions of one of the 365 "negative commandments". (see 613 commandments.)

In parts of India, its meaning is interpreted as faith in one; referred from junction of a (one) and vera (faith)

Etymology
The noun aveirah in rabbinical Hebrew derives from the verb avar, "pass over," which in a small number of uses in the Hebrew Bible can also carry the sense of "transgress", as in Deuteronomy 17:2 "in transgressing his covenant" (לַעֲבֹר בְּרִיתֹֽו la-'avor berithu).

In Modern Israeli Hebrew, aveira is the word for crime.

Categories
There are three categories of a person who commits an aveira. The most serious category is someone who does an aveira intentionally (be-mezid "on purpose"). The second is one who did an aveira by accident (be-shogeg). While such a person is still responsible for their action, it is considered less serious. The third category is someone who is a tinok shenishba, which is a person who was raised in an environment that was assimilated or non-Jewish, and is therefore not aware of the proper Jewish laws. This person is not held accountable for their actions.

In addition to the categories of people who commit an aveira, there are also two general categories of aveirot (plural), which categories are also applied to  the mitzvot. The first category is bein adam lamakom, or "between man and God." These transgressions are those that involve acts of defiance to God, whether they are not following the commandments that God has defined, acts of apostasy, etc. The second category is bein adam lechaveiro, or "between man and his fellow." Examples include harming another person, shaming them, misleading them, etc.

Liability
In general, one who willingly commits an aveira is liable for their actions. Even one who unintentionally commits an aveira, either because of lack of knowledge or unawareness that the act is forbidden, or that one's action is causing a transgression (e.g. opening a refrigerator door on Shabbat unaware that it turns on a light) is somewhat liable. But a person who cannot control him/herself and prevent the behavior due to a physical or mental illness or disability is not considered to be liable.

Health
For example, a severely intellectually disabled person who cannot possibly comprehend Torah law is not liable to keep the mitzvot. A person with dementia who picks up and eats non-kosher food has not transgressed a commandment because his/her mind could not recognize that such food is not permitted. A person who suddenly falls due to a medical condition out of his/her control, and while falling, causes a light to get turned on has not violated Shabbat.

Lack of awareness of Jewish identity
A person who is Jewish, but is not raised as Jewish, and is unaware that they are Jewish is not held liable for following Jewish law. If such a person learns during their lifetime that they are Jewish, they are not expected to immediately begin following Jewish law. Only if they learn proper Jewish law and have accepted it upon themself are they, from that moment on, responsible for their actions under the laws of the Torah.

Atonement
Depending on the type of the aveira, the requirement for atonement varies. For an aveira toward God, atonement is made by seriously repenting to God on Yom Kippur. For an aveira against a fellow man, God does not grant forgiveness unless the victim forgives the sinner first.

For aveirot against God, whether or not God is willing to grant forgiveness depends on the seriousness of the repentance, which depends upon the sinner's willingness to change his behavior in the future. For an aveira that is committed intentionally, knowing at the time that the action was an aveira, achieving forgiveness is hardest. God may be willing to forgive if the sinner was acting rebelliously at the time but has since decided to repent for the rebellious behavior, or if the sinner acted on an uncontrolled impulse, but has since learned to control his behavior.

If the aveira was committed through a lack of knowledge, God is willing to forgive if the sinner willingly learns the appropriate law and commits himself to not violating that law again.

If the aveira is committed by accident, such as accidentally watering a plant on Shabbat, God is willing to forgive the repentant sinner. The sinner should take appropriate action to avoid repeating the aveira accidentally.

Pikuach nefesh

For most aveirot (such as violating the restrictions of Shabbat), if one must commit the aveira to save or possibly save a human life that is believed to be in danger, they are required to do so, and such an act is not considered an aveira, but is rather the fulfillment of one of the greatest mitzvot. This is the situation, regardless of whether this is a one-time occurrence, or must take place on a regular, on-going basis. Pikuach nefesh applies to Jews and gentiles whose lives are in danger alike, but not to animals whose lives are in danger.

But there are a few exceptions. The major aveirot which traditional sources indicate a person should let themselves be killed rather than transgress include the Chillul Hashem (such as idolatry), murder, and immoral sexual behavior (adultery, incest, and other forbidden sex acts). Biblical prohibitions derived from these aveirot are also prohibited, even when a life is in danger.

See also
aveira goreret aveira "one sin leads to another sin" (Sayings of the Fathers 4:2)

References

Jewish law and rituals
Hebrew words and phrases in Jewish law